Acacia octonervia is a shrub of the genus Acacia and the subgenus Plurinerves that is endemic to a small area along the south western coast of Australia.

Description
Like most species of Acacia it has phyllodes rather than true leaves. It blooms from August to November and produces cream-yellow flowers.

Taxonomy
It is closely related to Acacia sulcata and belongs to the A. sulcata group of Acacias.

Distribution
It is native to an area in the Great Southern and Goldfields-Esperance regions of Western Australia where it is commonly situated on undulating plains and on lateritic rises growing in gravelly sandy, sandy-clay or loamy soils. The range of the plant extends from the Fitzgerald River in the west to around the Young River in the east with outlying populations found near Boxwood Hill further to the west. It is usually found as a part of dense low heath, open mallee and open dwarf scrubland communities.

See also
 List of Acacia species

References

octonervia
Acacias of Western Australia
Taxa named by Bruce Maslin
Plants described in 1993
Taxa named by Richard Sumner Cowan